Pastor Fido; Or, The Faithful Shepherd is a 1676 tragicomedy by the English writer Elkanah Settle. It was first performed by the Duke's Company at the Dorset Garden Theatre in London. It is inspired by Giovanni Battista Guarini's pastoral work Il pastor fido.

The original cast included Matthew Medbourne as Montano, John Crosby as Sylvio, William Smith as Mirtillo, Thomas Betterton as Sylvano, Henry Norris as Ergasto, Thomas Percival as Carino, John Richards as Dameta, Thomas Gillow as  Lynco, Mary Betterton as Amaryllis, Mary Lee as Corisca and Margaret Hughes as Gerana.

References

Bibliography
 Van Lennep, W. The London Stage, 1660-1800: Volume One, 1660-1700. Southern Illinois University Press, 1960.

1676 plays
West End plays
Tragedy plays
Plays by Elkanah Settle